Sundalema is a genus of southeast Asian long-legged cave spiders first described by H. F. Zhao, S. Q. Li and A. B. Zhang in 2020.

Species
 it contains four species:
S. acicularis (Wang & Li, 2010) – Thailand
S. anguina (Wang & Li, 2010) – Thailand
S. bonjol Zhao & Li, 2020 (type) – Indonesia (Sumatra)
S. khaorakkiat Zhao & Li, 2020 – Thailand

See also
 Telema
 List of Telemidae species

References

Further reading

Telemidae genera
Spiders of Asia